Edward Thomson Fairchild (October 30, 1854 – January 23, 1917) was the third elected President of the New Hampshire College of Agriculture and Mechanical Arts in Durham, New Hampshire from 1912 to January 23, 1917, when he died in office at age 62. Prior to serving as President of New Hampshire College, Fairchild served as Kansas state superintendent of public instruction.

The University of New Hampshire built a residence hall named Fairchild Hall in his honor while still serving a President, it was dedicated on April 12, 1916.

References

External links
UNH Web site
University of New Hampshire: Office of the President
Full list of University Presidents (including interim Presidents), University of New Hampshire Library

1854 births
1917 deaths
Presidents of the University of New Hampshire
People from Doylestown, Ohio